Dolby Headphone is a technology developed by Lake Technology (Australia), that later sold marketing rights to Dolby Laboratories, sometimes referred to as Mobile Surround, which creates a virtual surround sound environment in real-time using any set of two-channel stereo headphones. It takes as input either a 5.1 or a 7.1 channel signal, a Dolby Pro Logic II encoded 2 channel signal (from which 5 or 7 channels can be derived) or a stereo 2 channel signal. It sends as output a 2 channel stereo signal that includes audio cues intended to place the input channels in a simulated virtual soundstage.

Dolby Headphone is incorporated into the audio decoders packaged with surround headphones including:
 Razer Thresher 7.1
 Razer Thresher Ultimate
 HyperX Cloud Revolver S
 Astro Gaming A40 System
 Astro Gaming A50 System
 Logitech G430
 Logitech G35
Logitech G930
 Logitech G933
 Logitech G633
 Plantronics GameCom Commander
 Plantronics Gamecom 777
 Plantronics Gamecom 780 
 Plantronics GameCom 788 
 Plantronics RIG 500E 
 Turtle Beach Systems Ear Force DXL1
 Turtle Beach Systems Ear Force X41 
 Turtle Beach Systems Ear Force X42
 Turtle Beach Systems Ear Force Recon 320
 Xbox Live Gaming Headset
 Tritton Technologies AX720 Gaming Headset
 Corsair HS1 USB Gaming Headset
 Corsair Void Pro RGB Wireless
 Sennheiser PC 163D
 Sennheiser PC 333D
 Sennheiser PC 363D
 Sennheiser PC 373D
 SteelSeries Siberia Elite Prism
 SteelSeries SteelSeries Siberia 800
 
Dolby Headphone is supported by various netbooks, including the Lenovo IdeaPad S10-2 and the Acer Aspire One. Certain Asus Xonar soundcards also have Dolby Headphone support, including Asus Xonar models: D1, D2/PM, DX, D2X, DG, HDAV1.3, ST, STX, STX II, Xense and U3. PowerDVD Ultra 9 also supports Dolby Headphone when certain options are set in the "Settings" menu but PowerDVD is not marketed as an official product of Dolby Headphone.

Several Nokia smartphones such as the Nokia N9 officially support Dolby Headphone, and the technology is also supported in the new version of the Nokia Belle Feature Pack 1. The functionality is either pre-installed or is available as an update for the Nokia 603, 700, 701 and 808 Pureview, and is included on many models in the Lumia series including the 810, 820, 920 and 1020.

The technology has since been replaced by "Dolby Atmos For Headphones", which mainly adds the extra simulation required for the Atmos surround channels to the pre-existing technology. This converts the technology into full Binaural surround. Many argue that Dolby Headphone is superior for virtual 5.1 audio.

History 
The headphone virtual surround sound technology was initially developed and marketed by Lake Technology in 1997. 

In October 1998, Dolby licensed the headphone surround sound technology from Lake and renamed it 'Dolby Headphone'.

On 23rd Dec 2003, Dolby Laboratories bought over Lake Technology, including the Dolby Headphone technology, for A$21.6 million.

Technology

Head-related transfer functions (HRTFs) are used to generate positional audio cues in the two-channel output signal. A finite impulse response (FIR) filter is used to process the audio with lower latency.

References

Further reading
 http://www.dolby.com/us/en/technologies/dolby-headphone.html
 http://www.dspguru.com/dsp/faqs/fir

Audio codecs
Dolby Laboratories
Surround sound